Robin L. Titus (born February 21, 1954) is an American physician and politician. She serves as a Republican member of the Nevada Senate representing the 17th district. She previously served in the Nevada Assembly.

Early life
Titus was born in Trenton, New Jersey. She was educated at the Smith Valley High School, graduating in 1972. She graduated from the University of Nevada, Reno, where she received a bachelor of science in 1976, and she became a Doctor of Medicine (MD) from the University of Nevada School of Medicine in Reno, Nevada in 1981.

Career
Titus is a physician in Lyon County, Nevada. In 1989, she had an office in Wellington and another one in Yerington. She stopped delivering babies when the insurance premiums were raised and she could no longer afford them. However, by 2014, she still maintained a medical practice in Wellington.

Titus served as a Republican member of the Nevada Assembly, where she represents District 38. She is the president of the Smith Valley Historical Society.

Personal life
Titus is married to Allen Veil, who previously served as the sheriff of Lyon County. She has two children. They reside in Wellington, Nevada.

References

1954 births
21st-century American politicians
21st-century American women politicians
Living people
People from Lyon County, Nevada
Politicians from Trenton, New Jersey
Republican Party members of the Nevada Assembly
University of Nevada, Reno alumni
Women opposition leaders
Women state legislators in Nevada